Alfredo Ramos may refer to:

Alfredo Ramos (Portuguese footballer) (1906–deceased)
Alfredo Ramos (Brazilian footballer) (1924–2012)
Alfredo Ramos Martínez (1871–1946), Mexican painter, muralist, and educator